The Maiford River is a river in the U.S. state of Rhode Island. It flows approximately 1 km (0.6 mi). There are no dams along the river's length.

Course
The river rises from an unnamed pond north of Gardiner Pond in Middletown. From there, it flows due south along Hanging Rock Road to the Maidford River.

Crossings
Hanging Rock Road is the only crossing over the Maiford River due to its short length.

Tributaries
The Maiford River has no named or unnamed streams that feed it.

See also
List of rivers in Rhode Island

References
Maps from the United States Geological Survey

Rivers of Newport County, Rhode Island
Rivers of Rhode Island